Tillandsia lautneri is a species of flowering plant in the genus Tillandsia. This species is native to Mexico.

References

lautneri
Flora of Mexico